CHVO may refer to:

 CHVO-FM, a radio station (103.9 FM) licensed to Carbonear, Newfoundland and Labrador, Canada
 Centre Hospitalier des Vallées de l'Outaouais, a hospital in Gatineau, Quebec